Hypena opulenta is a moth in the family Erebidae (formerly in the family Noctuidae). The species was first described by Hugo Theodor Christoph in 1877. Its reported native range expands from Eastern Europe Ukraine and Russia, south to Afghanistan, Iran, and Syria. In 2013, the moth larva was approved for release in North America to act as a biocontrol agent for invasive swallow-wort plants, Vincetoxicum rossicum and Vincetoxicum nigrum.

Life cycle

Hypena opulenta overwinters as pupa. Moths emerge in late spring. The eggs are deposited on the under and upper sides of host plants along main veins. Larvae go through five instars and take four to six weeks to develop. They have been reported to feed on Vincetoxicum rossicum and Vincetoxicum scandens in the wild, and to also be able to develop on Vincetoxicum nigrum and Vincetoxicum hirundinaria in the laboratory. Pupation occurs either on the host plant within leaves tied with silk or on the ground within the leaf litter. Hypena opulenta has a facultative diapause and is believed to usually undergo two generations per year. Overwintering is triggered by short photoperiod.

References

Hazlehurst, A. F., Weed, A. S., Tewksbury, L. & Casagrande, R. A. (2012). "Host specificity of Hypena opulenta: a potential biological control agent of Vincetoxicum in North America". Environmental Entomology. 41: 841–848.

Moths described in 1877
opulenta